Jonathan Raymond Breck (born February 17, 1965) is an American actor. Beginning his career as a stage actor, Breck is best known for his role as the Creeper in Victor Salva's horror film Jeepers Creepers. He has also appeared in numerous other film and television productions including Beat Boys, Beat Girls, Good Advice, Spiders, I Married a Monster, JAG, Star Trek: Voyager, V.I.P., and Push.

Filmography

Film

Television

References

External links 
 
 

1965 births
American male film actors
Living people
Male actors from Texas